Ranger Lake is a  reservoir located in the Cleveland Metroparks Mill Stream Run Reservation in Strongsville, Cuyahoga County, Ohio.

The lake has been stocked to establish sport fishing populations of largemouth bass, bluegill, pumpkinseed sunfish, crappie, channel catfish, and rainbow trout. The lake is stocked with trout in the winter for ice fishing.

Prior to flooding the lake, the tree and brush cover along the west side of the lake was left standing to provide improved fish habitat. Fishermen will find this area productive for catching fish.

Special fishing regulations are posted at Ranger Lake for largemouth bass and rainbow trout. The daily harvest for rainbow trout is three fish per angler.

Notes

References 

Bodies of water of Cuyahoga County, Ohio
Reservoirs in Ohio
Strongsville, Ohio